Halabokhad is a small town in the north-central Mudug region of Somalia.

Overview
Halabokhad is situated near Galkacyo, the capital of the Mudug region.

The town is primarily inhabited by people from the Somali ethnic group, with the Maalismoge sub-clan of the Leelkase especially well represented.

Populated places in Mudug